The 2013 Grande Prêmio do Cinema Brasileiro is the 12th edition of Grande Prêmio do Cinema Brasileiro, presented by Academia Brasileira de Cinema (Brazilian Academy of Cinema), honored the best Brazilians films of 2012. The ceremony took place on November 13, 2013, at Cidade das Artes, Rio de Janeiro and was televised by Canal Brasil.

Winners and nominees

Winners are listed first and highlighted in boldface.

Audience Awards 
Best Film: Febre do Rato
Best Documentary: Raul - O Início, o Fim e o Meio
Best Foreign Film : The Intouchables

See also
 Cinema of Brazil

References

Brazilian film awards
Grande Premio do Cinema Brasileiro